''Helichrysum'' sp. nov. A is a species of flowering plant in the family Asteraceae. It is found only in Yemen. Its natural habitat is rocky areas.

References

Sp Nov A
Vulnerable plants
Undescribed plant species
Taxonomy articles created by Polbot